KDD Group (Kyiv Donbas Development) is a Ukrainian real estate development company famous for its half-built Sky Towers mixed-use development in Kyiv. The company was liquidated in 2016.

References

Real estate companies of Ukraine
Ukrainian brands
Real estate companies established in 1994
Companies listed on the Alternative Investment Market
Companies based in Kyiv